The Arkansas Razorbacks women's soccer team represents the University of Arkansas in the Southeastern Conference of NCAA Division I soccer. The program was founded in 1986, and is currently led by Colby Hale, in his ninth season.

Roster

Seasons

Legend:

References

External links
 

 
Soccer clubs in Arkansas
NCAA Division I women's soccer teams